Kara Ada or Karaada, literally "Black Island", may refer to:
Kara Ada (Bodrum), an island near Bodrum, Muğla province
Kara Ada (Rabbit islands), an island in Çanakkale province
Kara Ada (Izmir), an island west of Izmir in Çeşme district
Karaada (Meis), a Greek islet near Kastelorizo